The tap code, sometimes called the knock code, is a way to encode text messages on a letter-by-letter basis in a very simple way. The message is transmitted using a series of tap sounds, hence its name.

The tap code has been commonly used by prisoners to communicate with each other.  The method of communicating is usually by tapping either the metal bars, pipes or the walls inside a cell.

Design 
The tap code is based on a Polybius square using a 5×5 grid of letters representing all the letters of the Latin alphabet, except for K, which is represented by C.

Each letter is communicated by tapping two numbers, the first designating the row and the second (after a pause) designating the column. For example, to specify the letter "B", one taps once, pauses, and then taps twice. The listener only needs to discriminate the timing of the taps to isolate letters.

To communicate the word "water", the cipher would be the following (with the pause between each number in a pair being shorter than the pause between letters):

The letter "X" is used to break up sentences, and "K" for acknowledgements.

Because of the difficulty and length of time required for specifying a single letter, prisoners often devise abbreviations and acronyms for common items or phrases, such as "GN" for Good night, or "GBU" for God bless you.

By comparison, Morse code is harder to send by tapping or banging because a single tap will fade out and thus has no discernible length. Morse code, however, requires the ability to create two distinguishable lengths (or types) of taps. To simulate Morse by tapping therefore requires either two different sounds (pitch, volume), or very precise timing, so that a dash within a character (e.g. the character N) remains distinguishable from a dot at the end of a character (e.g. E-E). Morse code also takes longer to learn. Learning the tap system simply requires one to know the alphabet and the short sequence "AFLQV" (the initial letter of each row), without memorising the entire grid. For example, if a person hears four knocks, they can think "A... F... L... Q". If after a pause there are three knocks, they think "Q... R... S" to arrive at the letter S.

History 

The origins of this encoding go back to the Polybius square of Ancient Greece.  Like the "knock code", a Cyrillic script version is said to have been used by nihilist prisoners of the Russian czars.  The knock code is featured in Arthur Koestler's 1941 work Darkness at Noon. Kurt Vonnegut's 1952 novel Player Piano also includes a conversation between prisoners using a form of tap code. The code used in the novel is more primitive and does not make use of the Polybius square (e.g. "P" consists of sixteen taps in a row).

United States prisoners of war during the Vietnam War are most known for having used the tap code.  It was introduced in June 1965 by four POWs held in the Hỏa Lò ("Hanoi Hilton") prison: Captain Carlyle "Smitty" Harris, Lieutenant Phillip Butler, Lieutenant Robert Peel, and Lieutenant Commander Robert Shumaker. Harris had heard of the tap code being used by prisoners in World War II and remembered a United States Air Force instructor who had discussed it as well.

In Vietnam, the tap code became a very successful way for otherwise isolated prisoners to communicate. POWs would use the tap code in order to communicate to each other between cells in a way which the guards would be unable to pick up on. They used it to communicate everything from what questions interrogators were asking (in order for everyone to stay consistent with a deceptive story), to who was hurt and needed others to donate meager food rations.  It was easy to teach and newly arrived prisoners became fluent in it within a few days.  It was even used when prisoners were sitting next to each other but not allowed to talk, by tapping on another's thigh.  By overcoming isolation with the tap code, prisoners were said to be able to maintain a chain of command and keep up morale.

References

External links
 Online Tap Code Encoder/Decoder
 Russian Prison Tap Codes
L' Alfabeto Quadrato(Codice a Colpi) - An Degrida Artist An Degrida's Tap Code artistic illustration.

Classical ciphers
Encodings